Utricularia cornuta, the horned bladderwort, is a small to medium-sized, probably perennial carnivorous plant that belongs to the genus Utricularia. U. cornuta is endemic to North America and can be found in the Bahamas, Cuba, Canada, and the United States. It grows as a terrestrial or subaquatic plant in marshes, swamps, and pools in shallow waters, mostly at lower altitudes. It was originally described and published by André Michaux in 1803.

See also 
 List of Utricularia species

References 

Carnivorous plants of South America
Carnivorous plants of North America
Flora of the Northeastern United States
Flora of the North-Central United States
Flora of the Southeastern United States
Flora of Eastern Canada
Flora of Western Canada
cornuta
Flora without expected TNC conservation status